Sean McDermott (born November 3, 1996) is an American professional basketball player for the Memphis Hustle of the NBA G League. He played college basketball at Butler.

Early life and high school
McDermott grew up in Anderson, Indiana and attended Pendleton Heights High School. His mother ran a fitness center called "The Sports Center" where McDermott was often found playing basketball. As a senior, he averaged 16 points and 6.6 rebounds and was named an Indiana All-Star as he led the Arabians to the Hoosier Heritage Conference. McDermott committed to play college basketball at Butler over offers from Illinois State, Indiana State, New Orleans and UNC Greensboro.  His uncle is long-time college coach, Linc Darner.

College career
McDermott was a member of the Butler Bulldogs for five seasons, redshirting as a true freshman. He became a role player off the bench as a redshirt freshman and averaged 2.3 points, 1.4 rebounds and 10.7 minutes of playing time in 30 games played. He became a starter midway through the following season and finished year averaging 7.5 points and 3.9 rebounds over 31 games. McDermott averaged 9.5 points and 3.9 rebounds in his first full season as a starter during his redshirt junior year. On November 6, 2019, he scored a career-high 26 points on 10-of-11 shooting in an 80-47 win against IUPUI. As a redshirt senior, McDermott averaged 11.7 points and 6.3 rebounds per game.

Professional career

Memphis Grizzlies (2020–2021)
After going undrafted in the 2020 NBA Draft, McDermott agreed to terms on a two-way contract with the Memphis Grizzlies and signed with the team on November 24, 2020.

On August 25, 2021, McDermott was waived by the Grizzlies, but was re-signed on September 23. He was waived again on October 14.

Memphis Hustle (2021–present)
On October 23, 2021, McDermott signed with the Memphis Hustle as an affiliate player.

Career statistics

NBA

|-
| style="text-align:left;"| 
| style="text-align:left;"| Memphis
| 18 || 0 || 8.8 || .394 || .227 || 1.000 || 1.1 || .2 || .1 || .2 || 2.2
|- class="sortbottom"
| style="text-align:center;" colspan="2"| Career
| 18 || 0 || 8.8 || .394 || .227 || 1.000 || 1.1 || .2 || .1 || .2 || 2.2

References

External links
Butler Bulldogs bio

1996 births
Living people
American men's basketball players
Butler Bulldogs men's basketball players
Basketball players from Indiana
Memphis Grizzlies players
Memphis Hustle players
Sportspeople from Anderson, Indiana
Small forwards
Undrafted National Basketball Association players